Bhamodi is a census town in Chhindwara district in the state of Madhya Pradesh, India.

Demographics
 India census, Bhamodi had a population of 3,983. Males constitute 52% of the population and females 48%. Bhamodi has an average literacy rate of 74%, higher than the national average of 59.5%; with 58% of the males and 42% of the females literate. 9% of the population is under 6 years of age.

References

Cities and towns in Chhindwara district